River fire may refer to:

 Mendocino Complex Fire, a 2018 California wildfire that consisted of the smaller fires, the River Fire and the Ranch Fire
 Cuyahoga River in Ohio, a river famous for catching fire in 1969
 River Fire (2020), a wildfire in Monterey County, California
 River Fire (2021), a wildfire in Placer and Nevada Counties, California
 River Complex 2021 fires, a wildfire complex in Siskiyou County, California

See also
 River of Fire (disambiguation)
 RiverFire, an event on the Brisbane River in Queensland, Australia
 Fire River (disambiguation)